Manuela ("Manu") Canetti (born December 26, 1988 in Rio de Janeiro) is a female water polo goalkeeper from Brazil, who finished in fourth place with the Brazil women's national water polo team at the 2007 Pan American Games in Rio de Janeiro, Brazil. She also competed at the 2007 World Aquatics Championships, finishing in tenth place.

References
  Profile

1988 births
Living people
Brazilian female water polo players
Water polo players from Rio de Janeiro (city)
Water polo players at the 2007 Pan American Games
Water polo players at the 2011 Pan American Games
Pan American Games bronze medalists for Brazil
Pan American Games medalists in water polo
Medalists at the 2011 Pan American Games
21st-century Brazilian women
20th-century Brazilian women